Yun Il-gwang (born 1 April 1991) is a North Korean international football player.

Honours 
North Korea U23
Runners-up
 Asian Games: 2014

External links 
 
 
Yun Il-gwang at DPRKFootball

1991 births
Living people
North Korean footballers
North Korea international footballers
Footballers at the 2014 Asian Games
Asian Games medalists in football
Association football midfielders
Asian Games silver medalists for North Korea
Medalists at the 2014 Asian Games